KODE-TV (channel 12) is a television station licensed to Joplin, Missouri, United States, serving as the ABC affiliate for the Joplin, Missouri–Pittsburg, Kansas television market. It is owned by Mission Broadcasting, which maintains joint sales and shared services agreements (JSA/SSA) with Nexstar Media Group, owner of NBC affiliate KSNF (channel 16, also licensed to Joplin), for the provision of certain services. Both stations share studios on South Cleveland Avenue in Joplin, where KODE-TV's transmitter is also located.

History
The station began broadcasting on September 26, 1954 as KSWM-TV (for Southwestern Missouri) and was a primary CBS affiliate, but shared ABC with then-NBC affiliate KOAM-TV. It was locally founded by Austin Harrison who also owned radio station KODE AM 1230 (now KZYM). It originally operated from studios and transmitter located on West 13th Street in Joplin. Harrison sold the station to Friendly Broadcasting, owners of WSTV (now WTOV-TV) in Steubenville, Ohio in 1956. In 1957, the call letters were changed to the current KODE-TV. Friendly then sold both KODE and WRGP (now WRCB) in Chattanooga, Tennessee to Massachusetts-based United Printers & Publishers in 1961. Gilmore Broadcasting of Kalamazoo, Michigan, bought the KODE stations in 1962.

KODE became a sole ABC affiliate on January 1, 1968, and three days later KUHI-TV (now NBC-affiliated KSNF) started and took over the CBS affiliation.

On March 15, 1970, KODE weatherman Lee George made his famous flurries forecast.

KODE was acquired by Mission Broadcasting in 2002, following its takeover of Quorum Broadcasting. Subsequently, KODE then entered into a shared services agreement with Nexstar Broadcasting, which owns NBC affiliate KSNF. The same year, it was announced KSNF and KODE would merge, with building expansion planned at the KSN studios.

On May 8, 2009, a powerful storm system slammed Joplin, knocking out power to KODE and knocking down the tower of sister station KSNF. KODE-TV returned to the air early on the morning of May 9, while KSNF didn't return to the air until June 17. Both stations moved to a rebuilt KSNF building in April 2010 making it the next-to-last Nexstar duopoly to do so (as Nexstar formed a virtual duopoly in Evansville, Indiana, in December 2011 with the purchase of that market's ABC affiliate WEHT and transfer of its existing Evansville independent station (now CW affiliate) WTVW to Mission Broadcasting, and Nexstar almost immediately moved WTVW's operations to the WEHT facility).

On December 19, 2012, KODE began broadcasting its local newscasts in High Definition.

On June 15, 2016, Nexstar announced that it has entered into an affiliation agreement with Katz Broadcasting for the Escape, Laff, Grit, and Bounce TV networks (the last one of which is owned by Bounce Media LLC, whose COO Jonathan Katz is president/CEO of Katz Broadcasting), bringing the four networks to 81 stations owned and/or operated by Nexstar, including KODE-TV and KSNF.

Programming
Syndicated programming broadcast on KODE-TV includes Jeopardy! (which also airs on KSNF, though sister show Wheel of Fortune airs on KOAM-TV), Live with Kelly and Ryan, Sherri, Inside Edition, The Kelly Clarkson Show, and Entertainment Tonight. Unlike most ABC affiliates, KODE-TV is one of a few ABC affiliates to air paid programming on weekdays.

News operation
KODE-TV presently broadcasts 17 hours of local newscasts each week (with three hours each weekday and an hour each on Saturdays and Sundays).

Notable former on-air staff
 Jonathan Elias – reporter (now anchor at WJLA-TV in Washington, D.C.)
 Robb Hanrahan (formerly with WHP-TV, deceased)
 Evan Rosen (author of The Culture of Collaboration and The Bounty Effect)
 Marny Stanier (later with The Weather Channel, now working as a real estate agent in Georgia)

Subchannels
The station's digital signal is multiplexed:

References

External links 

KSNF Storm Damage

ABC network affiliates
Grit (TV network) affiliates
Bounce TV affiliates
Television channels and stations established in 1954
ODE-TV
1954 establishments in Missouri
Nexstar Media Group
Ion Television affiliates